CSS Alabamas New England Expeditionary Raid commenced shortly after the Confederate States Navy ship  left the Azores and cruised west toward the northeastern seaboard of Newfoundland and New England along the North American coastline. The primary area of operation during this expeditionary raid, was the eastern seaboard of the United States ranging as far down as Virginia and Bermuda.

Raid overview
CSS Alabama worked its way down the east coast during the month of October capturing three ships, and burning ten others, and encountering a hurricane along the way. Finally, departing station off the New England coast, the ship set sail for Martinique to rendezvous with its supply vessel, CSS Agrippina, burning two more ships on the way.

From this raiding area off the coast of New England, CSS Alabama made its way into the Caribbean Sea and the Gulf of Mexico to continue its unhindered wrecking of enemy commerce along the North American coastline.

Raid bounty

References
 Hearn, Chester G., Gray Raiders of the Sea, Louisiana State Press, 1996. 
 Luraghi, Raimondo, A History of the Confederate Navy, U.S. Naval Institute Press, 1996. 
 United States. Naval History Division, Civil War Naval Chronology, 1861-1865, Dept. of the Navy, 1961. 

New England Expeditionary Raid